The 2019 Clemson Tigers men's soccer team represented Clemson University during the 2019 NCAA Division I men's soccer season.  The Tigers were led by head coach Mike Noonan, in his tenth season.  They played home games at Riggs Field.  This was the team's 59th season playing organized men's college soccer and their 32nd playing in the Atlantic Coast Conference.

Background

The 2018 Clemson men's soccer team finished the season with a 7–9–1 overall record and a 2–6–0 ACC record.  The Tigers were seeded twelfth–overall in the 2018 ACC Men's Soccer Tournament, where they lost in the first round to Notre Dame.  The Tigers were not invited to the 2018 NCAA Division I Men's Soccer Tournament.  This was the first time in five years the Tigers did not qualify for the tournament.  Their seven wins was the Tigers' lowest win total since 2012.

At the end of the season, one Tigers men's soccer player was selected in the 2019 MLS SuperDraft: Patrick Bunk-Andersen.

Player movement

Players leaving

Players arriving

Squad

Roster
Updated December 9, 2019

Team management

Source:

Schedule

Source:

|-
!colspan=8 style=""| Exhibition

|-
!colspan=7 style=""| Regular season

|-
!colspan=7 style=""| ACC Tournament

|-
!colspan=7 style=""| NCAA Tournament

Goals Record

Disciplinary Record

Awards and honors

2020 MLS Super Draft

Source:

Rankings

References

2019
Clemson Tigers
Clemson Tigers
Clemson Tigers men's soccer
Clemson Tigers